TrackIR is an optical motion tracking controller for Microsoft Windows created by NaturalPoint Inc.. TrackIR tracks head motions with up to six degrees of freedom (6DOF) allowing handsfree view control for improved game immersion and situational awareness.

Head position and orientation are measured by a purpose-built video camera, mounted on top of the user's monitor, which observes infrared (IR) light reflected or emitted by markers on a rigid model worn by the user. TrackIR software is used to control the camera, as well as adjust tracking sensitivity. Head movements can be scaled, allowing a virtual movement of 180 degrees to occur, whilst the user still looks at the monitor.

History

TrackIR was initially designed as an assistive technology device for Windows cursor control.

Between 2002 and 2005, five TrackIR camera models were released, bringing improvements such as doubled frame rate and increased resolution, leading to more responsive and accurate tracking.

TrackIR interface with games

The proprietary TrackIR interface has become commonplace for view control in PC games and simulations and is only intended for use with TrackIR products.

As more developers and games added support for TrackIR, developers were successful in reverse engineering the proprietary interface allowing non-TrackIR devices to be used for view control, including generic webcams. This issue was resolved in October 2008, when the interface began encrypting the data stream sent to some new titles, rendering non-supported devices incompatible with these new game titles. However, due to the fact that older TrackIR-1 and TrackIR-2 products use software drivers which are no longer maintained, they are also incompatible with titles using the newer interface.

Criticisms

TrackIR 4 Pro

Some reviewers found the TrackIR 4 Pro with TrackClip Pro bundle to be expensive at the $200–$220 price, while still considering it a worthwhile purchase for serious simulation users. As of June, 2009 the bundle is available for $120.
Additionally, one review noted that the TrackIR 4 Pro runs at a temperature which they consider higher than normal when it is actively tracking.

TrackClip PRO

Some reviewers found the TrackClip PRO to have loose joints, be less durable than desired, and one was disappointed that it was unable to be positioned on the right side of the head, while still recommending the product.

See also
FreeTrack, an open-source and free head-tracking software which users can build their tracking hardware with webcams and infrared LEDs cheaply. Freetrack is no longer maintained.
 FaceTrackNoIR, an open-source and free head-tracking software which requires only a webcam and no infrared LEDs.
 opentrack, an active open-source project combining many features of FreeTrack and FaceTrackNoIR. Input sources include facial recognition, IR point tracking, paper marker tracking, and more.

References

External links
 NaturalPoint Inc. official website
 opentrack software project website

Game controllers
Mixed reality
Tracking